This is a list of National Soccer League (NSL) champions. The NSL was the elite football (soccer) competition in Australia from 1977 until 2004, when the competition was scrapped and replaced in 2005 by the fully professional A-League.

National Soccer League Champions 

From 1977 until 1983, the winner was the top placed team at the end of the season. From 1984 until 1986, the competition was split into two conferences, with playoffs to decide two grand finalists who met over two legs. In 1987 the system reverted to the pre 1984 system. From 1988 until the demise of the league in 2004, various playoff systems were used to decide the champion. 

The numbers in brackets indicate the number of championships won by a team, or the number of Grand Finals held in a city.

Playoff Series Champions 
From 1977–1983 and 1987, the top placed team at the end of the regular season was declared champion. However a compromise format was devised between the traditional first past the post system and the Australian system of finals. A Playoff series was conducted in these years except for the 1977, 1981 & 1983 seasons, however the winner of the Playoff Series didn't become champion of the NSL.

The numbers in brackets indicate the number of playoff series won by a team, or the number of Grand Finals held in a city.

NSL Cup Winners
The NSL also held a cup competition, which was held initially during the regular season, before gradually becoming a pre-season warm-up tournament. It was discontinued after the 1996–97 season.

The numbers in brackets indicate the number of cups won by a team, or the number of Cup Finals held in a city.

National Youth League
The NSL also had a national youth competition, consisting of a variety teams, both from within and outside of the NSL's membership. The competition began in 1984, and was ended at the same time as the NSL, in 2004.

See also
 List of A-League honours
 List of Australian soccer champions

References

External links
 RSSSF.com - Australia - List of Champions

National Soccer League (Australia)